Shree Amber Gurung (26 February 1938 – 7 June 2016) was a Nepalese composer, singer, and lyricist. He composed Nepal's national anthem, "Sayaun Thunga Phulka".

Early life 
Amber Gurung was born in Darjeeling, India, where his father and former soldier in the British Indian Army, Ujir Singh Gurung, served as a policeman from Gorkha district, Nepal. His mother encouraged him to sing and compose as a child, and he taught himself to play Nepali, Indian, and Western instruments. He studied at Turnbull School, Darjeeling, where he fell in love with music while singing Bible Hymns.

Career 
In the 1950s, he formed an association with Nepali poet Agam Singh Giri.He has wote over 100 song. He became the headmaster of Bhanu Bhakta School, founded by Giri, and pioneered the Art Academy of Music. He recorded his most famous song "Nau Lakh Tara" (a song about the sufferings of the Nepali diaspora in India) in the early 1960s, written by Giri. His students included musicians and singers such as Gopal Yonzon, Karma Yonzon, Aruna Lama, Sharan Pradhan, Peter Karthak, Indra Gajmer, Jitendra Bardewa and Ranjit Gazmer. He worked as the Music Chief of Folk Entertainment Unit, Government of West Bengal, Darjeeling from 1962 to 1965. He was barred from singing or recording songs outside the unit. He later moved and settled in Kathmandu, Nepal, in 1969.

On 1 January 2014, he was given the title "Mahan Sangeetkar" by Himalayan Tones Music Academy of Hong Kong. Organizing "Amber Gurung Ratri", Dinesh Subba. Gurung composed Nepal’s new national anthem, Sayaun Thunga Phulka in 2007. He was invited by Nepal's King Mahendra to return to Nepal to establish and chair the music department of the newly founded Nepal Academy of Arts in 1968, where he served as Music Director for nearly 30 years. He was appointed the founding Chancellor of Nepal Academy of Music and Drama in 2010.

Death 
Amber Gurung died on 7 June 2016 at the age of 78. At the time, he was suffering from diabetes and Parkinson's disease.

References

External links
 Articles By Ambar Gurung published in Kantipur
 Nepalicollections.com – Amber Gurung's Song
 Amber gurung Ratri – Hong kong nepali.com
 Amber gurung Ratri – Alopalo.com
 Mahasenani AG – ekantipur.com
 

1938 births
2016 deaths
 Nepalese musicians
 Nepalese Buddhists
 People from Gorkha District
 People from Darjeeling
 People from Kathmandu
 Order of Gorkha Dakshina Bahu
 National anthem writers
Jagadamba Shree Puraskar winners
Gurung people
Musicians from West Bengal
Nepali-language singers from India